Kəbirli (also, Kebirli) is a village and municipality in the Beylagan Rayon of Azerbaijan.  It has a population of 4,250.

Notable natives 
 
 Mukhtar Gasimov — National Hero of Azerbaijan.

References 

Populated places in Beylagan District